Myzino is a rural locality (a village) in Lavrovskoye Rural Settlement, Sudogodsky District, Vladimir Oblast, Russia. The population was 29 as of 2010.

Geography 
Myzino is located 15 km northeast of Sudogda (the district's administrative centre) by road. Dorofeyevo is the nearest rural locality.

References 

Rural localities in Sudogodsky District
Sudogodsky Uyezd